Aeon Point is the easternmost point of Kiritimati Island in Kiribati. There is an abandoned airport, named Aeon Field, near Aeon Point which was constructed before British nuclear tests.

References

Landforms of Kiribati
Headlands of Oceania